General elections were held in Papua New Guinea between 24 June and 8 July 2017. The writs for the election were issued on 20 April, and candidate nominations closed on 27 April.

Michael Somare, the first Prime Minister of Papua New Guinea, retired as a Member of National Parliament at the election. Somare has served continuously since he was first elected to the pre-independence House of Assembly in 1968, an unbroken term of 49 years.

On 1 August 2017 Peter O'Neill was re-elected as Prime Minister by Parliament by a vote of 64–40.

Electoral system
The 111 members of the National Parliament were elected from single-member constituencies by preferential voting; voters were given up to three preferences, with a candidate declared elected once they received over 50% of preference votes. Of the 111 members, 89 were elected from "open" seats and 22 from provincial seats based on the twenty provinces, the Autonomous Region of Bougainville and the National Capital District (Port Moresby). The provincial members are also the governors of their respective provinces, unless they take a ministerial position, in which case the position goes to one of the members for the open seats.

Schedule
Important dates in the election are listed below.

The Return of Writs was postponed to 29 July due to few of the 111 seats being declared. The Writs were presented to Governor General Sir Robert Dadae on 29 July by Electoral Commissioner Patilias Gamato, with only 80 seats declared.

Candidates
The Papua New Guinea Electoral Commission reported in preliminary figures that 3332 candidates have nominated to contest the election, 165 candidates of whom are women.

Campaign
There has reportedly been less activity in the 2017 election compared to previous elections, with PNG National Party Leader Kerenga Kua saying "There is less colour, less movement, and that's not good, because you need to have some level of activity for educational purposes". Four people died in clashes regarding the election, with several candidates attacked during campaigning or nominations, to which Electoral Comisisoner Patilias Gamato said "We have not gone into polls yet but already people are engaging in violent activities, threats and intimidation — that's unnecessary."

Ezekiel Anisi, MP for Ambunti-Dreikikir Open died suddenly on 24 May 2017 at a Port Moresby guesthouse in the midst of his re-election campaign.

Conduct
The Bank of Papua New Guinea is concerned that 160 Million Kina of old currency which was stolen has the potential to influence the election. There are concerns in the Menyama District of Morobe Province that poor weather conditions affecting road transport could cause issues with the transportation of polling materials closer towards the election.

Significant issues with voting had arisen by late June. On 27 June, the day voting was due to begin in the National Capital District, voting in all three electorates there was delayed until 30 June after polling officials went on strike due to unpaid allowances. At least sixteen electoral officials were arrested, including NCD election manager Terrence Hetinu, who was found with US$57,000 in cash stored in his car, while NCD assistant returning officer Roselyn Tobogani was arrested after officials were found smuggling ballot papers out of the provincial election office.

Voting in Chimbu Province, Hela Province and Western Highlands Province failed to begin on schedule on 26 June due to issues with the common roll and disputes over numbers of ballot papers, while voting in Eastern Highlands Province only commenced on a limited basis amidst reports that "thousands of students" had been left off the electoral roll.

Electoral Commissioner Patilias Gamato obtained a court order against blogger Martyn Namorong, restricting him from sharing defamatory statements against the commissioner. This came after Gamato received criticism which compared him and his surname to a tomato.

Results
No women were elected, making Papua New Guinea one of only three or four countries in the world (as of 1 February 2019) to have no women in the legislature.

See also

Members of the National Parliament of Papua New Guinea, 2017–2022
Women in the National Parliament of Papua New Guinea

Notes

References

External links
Papua New Guinea Election Commission
Registered Political Parties 
Preliminary Candidate Nominations 
Election Dates 

Papua
2017 in Papua New Guinea
Elections in Papua New Guinea
Papua
Papua
Election and referendum articles with incomplete results